is the 43rd single by the Japanese idol girl group AKB48. It marks the 10th annual anniversary of the group, and was released in Japan on March 9, 2016. It sold 1,133,179 copies on release day, topping the weekly sales of the previous single. This makes it the 30th single to reach 1st place in the Oricon Single Charts, and the 24th single to sell over a million copies in a week.

The main song from this single, Kimi wa Melody has been redone in Bahasa Indonesia by JKT48 and in Thai by BNK48 in 2018, and in Filipino by MNL48 in 2019.

Background
The music video of the title song is directed by Mika Ninagawa, who worked previously on "Heavy Rotation", "Sayonara Crawl" and "Sugar Rush". It was first performed live on January 24, on the last day of AKB48 Group Request Hour 2016, and its first TV performance was broadcast on February 22, on NHK's [[:ja:MUSIC JAPAN|Music Japan]]. 
The title track is performed by a group of 21 active members and centered (choreography center) by Sakura Miyawaki.

This single also marked the final appearance of two founding members, Minami Takahashi and Sae Miyazawa. Both of them left the AKB48 Group shortly after this release, after having appeared in the promoting line up of 41 and 33 AKB48 singles, respectively, as well as Karen Iwata.

On , Brazilian channel PlayTV aired the music video from "Kimi wa Melody" on a J-Pop segmented music video program Interferência Ichiban.

Artwork

Kimi wa Melody was released in five different issues (Type-A, Type-B, Type-C, Type-D, and Type-E) in which each issues have two different artwork for Regular edition and Limited edition. Only Theater version would issued only in one artwork,  in total Kimi wa Melody released 11 different artworks. Type-A, Type-B, and Type-E limited version featured all 21 participating members, while Theater version featured all 16 participating members without the graduates. Type-C limited version is Sakura Miyawaki first ever solo cover.

Track listing

Type-A

Type-B

Type-C

Type-D

Type-E

Theater Edition

Personnel

"Kimi wa Melody" 
The lineup for the A-side single performed by senbatsu of 21 members including 4 graduates, the first time since "Flying Get" back in 2011. The center for this song is Sakura Miyawaki.
 AKB48: Anna Iriyama, Haruna Kojima, Haruka Shimazaki, Minami Takahashi, Yui Yokoyama, Minami Minegishi, Mion Mukaichi, Yuki Kashiwagi, Rena Katō, Yuria Kizaki, Mayu Watanabe
 SKE48 : Jurina Matsui
 NMB48 : Sayaka Yamamoto
 HKT48 : Rino Sashihara, Sakura Miyawaki 
 NGT48 : Rie Kitahara
 SNH48 : Sae Miyazawa
 Graduated members: Atsuko Maeda, Yūko Ōshima, Mariko Shinoda, Tomomi Itano

"LALALA Message" 
Performed by selection "Next Generation Senbatsu", consisting of:
 AKB48 Team A: Anna Iriyama, Nana Owada, Megu Taniguchi
 AKB48 Team K: Yūka Tano, Mion Mukaichi , Tomu Muto
 AKB48 Team B: Ryōka Ōshima, Rena Katō, Yuria Kizaki, Moe Goto
 AKB48 Team 4: Nana Okada, Saya Kawamoto, Mako Kojima, Haruka Komiyama, Juri Takahashi, Yuiri Murayama

"Gonna Jump" 
Performed by selection senbatsu members of SKE48, consisting of:
 SKE48 Team S: Rion Azuma, Masana Ōya, Ryoha Kitagawa, Jurina Matsui
 SKE48 Team KII: Yuna Ego, Mina Ōba, Sarina Sōda, Akane Takayanagi, Nao Furuhata
 SKE48 Team E: Kanon Kimoto, Haruka Kumazaki, Rara Goto , Aya Shibata, Maya Sugawara, Akari Suda, Marika Tani

"Shigamitsuita Seishun" 
Performed by selection senbatsu members of NMB48, consisting of:
 NMB48 Team N: Yuuri Ōta, Yuuka Kato, Kei Jonishi, Ririka Sutō, Sayaka Yamamoto , Akari Yoshida
 NMB48 Team M: Azusa Uemura, Miru Shiroma, Airi Tanigawa, Reina Fujie, Sae Murase, Fuuko Yagura
 NMB48 Team BII: Konomi Kusaka, Nagisa Shibuya, Shu Yabushita, Miyuki Watanabe

"Make Noise" 
Performed by selection senbatsu members of HKT48, consisting of:
 HKT48 Team H: Chihiro Anai, Mashiro Ui, Yui Kōjina, Haruka Kodama, Riko Sakaguchi, Rino Sashihara , Meru Tashima, Miku Tanaka, Natsumi Matsuoka, Nako Yabuki
 HKT48 Team KIV: Aika Ōta, Serina Kumazawa, Mio Tomonaga, Sakura Miyawaki, Aoi Motomura, Madoka Moriyasu

"Max Toki 315go" 
Performed by NGT48, consisting of:
 NGT48 Team NIII: Yuka Ogino, Tsugumi Oguma, Minami Katō, Rie Kitahara, Anju Satō, Riko Sugahara, Moeka Takakura , Ayaka Tano, Rika Nakai, Marina Nishigata, Rena Hasegawa, Hinata Honma, Fūka Murakumo, Maho Yamaguchi, Noe Yamada
 NGT48 Kenkyūsei: Yuria Ōtaki, Yuria Kado, Aina Kusakabe, Reina Seiji, Mau Takahashi, Ayuka Nakamura, Miharu Nara, Nanako Nishimura, Ayaka Mizusawa, Aya Miyajima

"Mazariau Mono" 
Performed by selection members of AKB48 and Nogizaka46, consisting of:
 AKB48 : Anna Iriyama, Haruna Kojima , Haruka Shimazaki, Nana Ōwada, Yui Yokoyama, Yuki Kashiwagi, Rena Katō
 SKE48 : Jurina Matsui
 HKT48 : Rino Sashihara, Sakura Miyawaki
 Nogizaka46: Erika Ikuta, Reika Sakurai, Mai Shiraishi, Nanase Nishino, Mai Fukagawa, Sayuri Matsumura

"M.T. ni Sasagu" 
AKB Team A's song (excluding Minami Takahashi). Yui Yokoyama serve as center for this song. It is also a name from current stage from Team A.
 AKB48 Team A: Anna Iriyama, Karen Iwata , Shizuka Ōya, Nana Owada, Mayu Ogasawara, Natsuki Kojima, Haruna Kojima, Yukari Sasaki, Haruka Shimazaki, Miru Shiroma, Kayoko Takita, Megu Taniguchi, Chiyori Nakanishi, Mariko Nakamura, Rena Nishiyama, Rina Hirata, Yui Hiwatashi, Ami Maeda, Miho Miyazaki, Sakura Miyawaki, Yui Yokoyama

Charts

Release history

Dirimu Melody

Dirimu Melody is the 18th single from the idol group JKT48 which was released in Indonesia on December 16, 2017 (for Music Cards, coinciding with the day before the 6th anniversary of JKT48 and Sonia Natalia's 20th) and 12 January 2018 (for CD and DVD, also available via Spotify and iTunes) by Hits Records and JKT48 Project, also distributed by Universal Music Indonesia and Sony Music Entertainment Indonesia. Previously, this single was released on CD and DVD planned for December 23, 2017 (to coincide with Team J's 5th birthday, as well as the celebration of JKT48's 6th anniversary concert at Bigbang Jakarta 2017 at JIExpo Kemayoran, Central Jakarta , DKI Jakarta, Indonesia), but was canceled due to technical problems. This single was recycled from the 43rd single from AKB48.

This single is a keepsake single as a sign of farewell to Melody who will be declared graduated from JKT48 on March 31, 2018 (before being replaced by Ayana as the dual position of Team KIII and Team T members as Captain and Shania as Captain of JKT48), and also occupies the center position. for the last.

Tracklisting

 Bold indicates centers.

Kimi wa Melody - เธอคือ...เมโลดี้ (BNK48 version) 

The Thai idol group BNK48, a sister group of AKB48, covered the song with the same title. It is their Fourth single released on September 28, 2018, and the first single to feature 21 senbatsu members.

Tracklisting 

 Bold indicates centers.

Ikaw ang Melody 

Ikaw ang Melody (English: You Are the Melody) is the fourth single of the all-girl Filipino idol group, MNL48. It is a cover of AKB48's "Kimi wa Melody". The single was released on July 26, 2019, and the single released for the group's 4th single Election.

Tracklisting 

 Bold indicates centers.

Notes 
1.Concurrent position with AKB48's Team A.
2.Concurrent position with NGT48's Team N.
3.Concurrent position with AKB48's Team K.
4.Concurrent position with SKE48's Team S.

Further reading

References

External links
 Type A Limited Edition — AKB48 discography on the official website

AKB48 songs
MNL48 songs
2016 singles
2016 songs
Songs with lyrics by Yasushi Akimoto
King Records (Japan) singles
Oricon Weekly number-one singles
Billboard Japan Hot 100 number-one singles